Xaverio Ballester (full name in Spanish transcription: Francisco Javier Ballester Gómez) is a Spanish linguist, professor at University of Valencia and one of main proponents of Paleolithic continuity theory (aka Paleolithic continuity paradigm).

Biography 
He obtained Ph.D. in Classical Philology at University of Barcelona in 1987. Teaching positions include: Professor titular of Latin Philology in the University of Zaragoza (1989); Professor of Latin Philology in the University of Valencia (1997); Professor of Latin Philology in the University of La Laguna (1997, resign).

Ballester is also co-editor of the journal Liburna.

Works 
Books on the Paleolithic Continuity Paradigm
 Las Primeras Palabras de la Humanidad, Valencia 2002.
 Zoónimos ancestrales, Valencia 2007. 
 Linguística Indo-Europeia Tradicional e Paradigma da Continuidade Paleolítica cara a cara, Lisboa 2009.

Other books
 A Catulo usque ad Catullum. Studia neoterica, Barcelona 1988.
 Fonemática del latín clásico. Consonantismo, Zaragoza 1996.
 Los Mejores Títulos y los Peores Versos de la Literatura Latina, Barcelona 1998.
 Gálatas, Getas y Atlantes. Tres Ensayos de GeoFilología Clásica, Valencia 2010.

References

External links
 Ballester's works at Paleolithic Continuity Paradigm website 

Living people
Linguists from Spain
Paleolinguists
Classical philologists
Spanish Latinists
Hispanists
Linguists of Iberian
Year of birth missing (living people)